Himatanthus obovatus is a species of genus Himatanthus in the family Apocynaceae, which is native Brazil, Bolivia, Guyana. It is common in Cerrado vegetation in Brazil. This plant is cited in Flora Brasiliensis by Carl Friedrich Philipp von Martius.

References

External links
Himatanthus obovatus
 Plumeria obovata

obovatus
Flora of South America
Flora of Brazil
Flora of the Cerrado
Plants described in 1860